Harnarayan Singh is a Canadian sports announcer and journalist. He became known for announcing the Punjabi-language broadcasts of Hockey Night in Canada, and currently calls games in English for Sportsnet and Hockey Night in Canada.

Early life 
Singh was born in December 1984, in Brooks, Alberta. His parents immigrated to Canada in the 1960s from India. Singh was an avid hockey fan as a child; he and his siblings were fans of Wayne Gretzky and the Edmonton Oilers, and would do mock announcing using toy microphones. He studied broadcasting at Mount Royal University in Calgary, where he hosted a hockey talk show on the student radio station. Singh was accepted into an internship at the TSN sports television network in 2004.

Broadcasting career 
After leaving TSN, Singh worked as a reporter for the Canadian Broadcasting Corporation's news service in Calgary. Singh came to the attention of fellow CBC employee, former NHL goalie, and announcer Kelly Hrudey; Hrudey recommended Singh to the network as a possible new announcer. Joel Darling, the executive producer of Hockey Night in Canada, then approached Singh about calling a hockey game in Punjabi, which Darling believed fit the public broadcaster's goal to "attract new Canadians and people who normally wouldn’t watch the sport of hockey". In 2009, Singh began announcing National Hockey League games in the Punjabi language for Hockey Night in Canada. He continued his work at CBC Calgary to pay for his weekly flights to Toronto, but the CBC eventually found out and paid for his travel. Singh had one of his games turn into a viral video in 2016 when he made an energetic call of goal-scorer Nick Bonino's name. He was the first person to announce an NHL game in Punjabi for television, and, in 2016, became the first Sikh Canadian to broadcast an NHL game in English. He also hosts a weekly online segment for the Calgary Flames organization.

In September 2020, Singh published a memoir, titled One Game at a Time, which details his early life and broadcasting career. On January 13, 2021, Singh made his English play-by-play debut, calling a regular season game between the Vancouver Canucks and Edmonton Oilers for Sportsnet. At the 9th Canadian Screen Awards in 2021, Singh won the award for Best Sports Play-by-Play.

Personal life 
On June 1, 2022, Singh was given an honorary Doctorate of Law by his alma mater Mount Royal University. He resides in Calgary and is married with two children.

References

External links 
 

Living people
Canadian television sportscasters
People from Brooks, Alberta
1984 births
Canadian people of Punjabi descent
Canadian Screen Award winners
Canadian Sikhs